Two Sons of Ringo is a 1966 Italian western-parody film starring the comic duo Franco and Ciccio. It was the last film directed by Giorgio Simonelli who, for health reasons, left the production just before the end of filming and was replaced by Giuliano Carnimeo.

Plot 
Franco and Ciccio leave Agrigento, in Sicily, to search of their fortune in the American West. In the land of cowboys and dueling weapons, they pretend to be skilled thieves and gunmen under the names Django and Gringo. When they meet a big shot, Franco and Ciccio are forced to live their roles and pretend to be the children of the great gunslinger Ringo.

Cast 
 Franco Franchi as Django
 Ciccio Ingrassia as Gringo
 Gloria Paul as  Dorothy
 George Hilton as  Joe
 Ignazio Spalla as  Indio
 Mimmo Palmara as The Sheriff 
 Umberto D'Orsi as  Simpson
 Orchidea De Santis as  Marisol
 Ivano Staccioli as  Burt
 Fulvia Franco as  Margaret
 Guido Lollobrigida as  Fred
 Enzo Andronico as  Notaio
 Nino Terzo as  Jimmy il Guercio

References

External links

Two Sons of Ringo at Variety Distribution

1966 films
Spaghetti Western films
1960s buddy comedy films
1960s Western (genre) comedy films
Italian parody films
Films directed by Giuliano Carnimeo
Italian buddy comedy films
1960s parody films
Films directed by Giorgio Simonelli
Films scored by Piero Umiliani
Django films
1966 comedy films
1960s Italian-language films
1960s Italian films